La Cellette is a commune in the Creuse department in the Nouvelle-Aquitaine region in central France.

Geography
The commune, with many streams, woods and lakes, borders the department of Indre.

Population

Sights
 The church of St. Pierre and St. Paul, dating from the twelfth century.
 The chateau Pointu.
 A memorial to a World War II aeroplane crash.

See also
Communes of the Creuse department

References

Communes of Creuse